Theo Katzman (born April 2, 1986) is an American multi-instrumentalist, singer, songwriter, and producer based in Los Angeles. His musical style is a fusion of pop, jazz, funk and indie rock. He is a member of funk band Vulfpeck and has contributed to the works of several artists as songwriter and producer. Katzman has released four studio albums. His latest album Be the Wheel was released in March 2023.

Career
Katzman grew up in a musical family in Manhasset, New York. His father, Lee Katzman, was a jazz trumpet player and would take him to rehearsals at an early age. When he was about twelve he started playing drums, guitar, and writing songs. In 2004, Katzman moved to Ann Arbor, Michigan and studied jazz at the University of Michigan. In 2005, he joined the instrumental group Toolbox which evolved into the band Ella Riot. Katzman toured with the band from 2007 to 2010. During that time the band released an EP titled My Dear Disco and an album titled Dancethink.

In early 2010, Katzman pursued a solo career to focus on his singing and songwriting. He formed the trio Love Massive, who performed regularly and opened at the Ann Arbor Folk Festival in 2011. Katzman released an EP titled Solo Acoustic in 2010 and released his first studio album Romance Without Finance in 2011. In late 2011, he moved to Brooklyn and released music videos for two of his songs, "Hard For You" and "Brooklyn". In 2012, he opened for several artists including Vanessa Carlton, Matisyahu, and Vienna Teng. In 2013, he was the musical director and the opening act for Darren Criss on his national tour, Listen Up, and released a single titled "Pop Song".

Katzman has worked with several artists as a songwriter and producer. He co-wrote and produced Face the Fire, an album by Michelle Chamuel, and co-wrote several songs for an album by Criss. He performs with the Irish-fusion band The Olllam, funk band Vulfpeck, and as a solo act.

Katzman released a single titled "Hard Work" in October 2016. Katzman's second studio album Heartbreak Hits was released in January 2017. According to Katzman, the album's concept was about heartbreak and loss. A review by Lee Zimmerman noted the album's "upbeat" tone despite the underlying lyrical concept.

In October 2019, Katzman released a single titled "You Could Be President", a preview of his third studio album Modern Johnny Sings: Songs in the Age of Vibe. The album was released in January 2020 under the label, Ten Good Songs.

Style
Katzman grew up listening to classic rock and soul music. His influences include soul, R&B, funk, rock and folk. As a songwriter, a primary focus for him is a song's lyrical theme. He writes parts for guitar, bass, drums, and keyboards. His favorite songwriters are those who "capture a moment in cultural time" such as Frank Ocean, Joni Mitchell and Paul Simon.

Personal life
Katzman's father, Lee Katzman, was a jazz trumpet player with The Tonight Show Band and the Stan Kenton Orchestra. Katzman's maternal grandparents were both classical musicians with the Detroit Symphony and the Philadelphia Orchestra.

Vulfpeck
In addition to his solo work, Katzman is a member of the funk band Vulfpeck. Formed in 2011, Vulfpeck is a four piece instrumental group made up of Katzman on guitar, drums and vocals, Jack Stratton on keyboards, drums and guitar, Woody Goss on keyboards, and Joe Dart on bass. The band has released four EPs and six studio albums.

Discography

Albums

Studio albums

Solo albums

with Ella Riot

with Vulfpeck

Live albums

Extended plays

Singles

As lead artist

As featured artist

Production and writing credits

References

External links
 
 
 

American male singer-songwriters
American indie rock musicians
21st-century American singers
21st-century American musicians
Musicians from Brooklyn
Musicians from Ann Arbor, Michigan
University of Michigan School of Music, Theatre & Dance alumni
Living people
1986 births
Singer-songwriters from New York (state)
Singer-songwriters from Michigan
21st-century American male singers
Manhasset High School alumni